The 2014 Scheldeprijs cycling race took place on 9 April. It was the 102nd time the Scheldeprijs was run. Marcel Kittel won the race for a third time, equaling the record of Piet Oellibrandt and Mark Cavendish, but being the first person in history with three consecutive wins.

The race was characterized by an early break consisting of six riders: Jan Ghyselinck, Luke Rowe, Dmitriy Gruzdev, Ivan Balykin, Andrea Fedi and Alessandro Bazzana, which built up a maximum lead of five minutes. This was the sign for Luke Rowe to attack, eventually being caught up by Andrea Fedi who did the same thing a bit later. Marcel Kittel started the sprint early but managed to speed away from his opponents. Behind him Tyler Farrar and Danny van Poppel finished second and third.

Results

References

External links

2014
Scheldeprijs
Scheldeprijs